In mathematics, a separable algebra is a kind of semisimple algebra.  It is a generalization to associative algebras of the notion of a separable field extension.

Definition and First Properties 
A ring homomorphism (of unital, but not necessarily commutative rings)

is called separable (or a separable extension) if the multiplication map

admits a section

by means of a homomorphism σ of A-A-bimodules. Such a section σ is determined by its value

σ(1). The condition that σ is a section of μ is equivalent to

and the condition to be an homomorphism of A-A-bimodules is equivalent to the following requirement for any a in A:

Such an element p is called a separability idempotent, since it satisfies .

Examples
For any commutative ring R, the (non-commutative) ring of n-by-n matrices  is a separable R-algebra. In particular, this shows that separability idempotents need not be unique.

Separable algebras over a field

If  is a field extension, then L is separable as an associative K-algebra if and only if the extension of fields is separable.
The trace map and its dual bases make explicit L as a Frobenius algebra over K.

More generally, separable algebras over a field K can be classified as follows: they are the same as finite products of matrix algebras over finite-dimensional division algebras whose centers are finite-dimensional separable field extensions of the field K. In particular: Every separable algebra is itself finite-dimensional. If K is a perfect field --- for example a field of characteristic zero, or a finite field, or an algebraically closed field --- then every extension of K is separable so that separable K-algebras are finite products of matrix algebras over finite-dimensional division algebras over field K.  In other words, if K is a perfect field, there is no difference between a separable algebra over K and a finite-dimensional semisimple algebra over K.
It can be shown by a generalized theorem of Maschke that an associative K-algebra A is separable if for every field extension  the algebra  is semisimple.

Group rings

If K is commutative ring and G is a finite group such that the order of G is invertible in K, then the group ring K[G] is a separable K-algebra.

Equivalent characterizations of separability
There are several equivalent definitions of separable algebras.
Separable extensions can also be characterized by means of split extensions: A is separable over K if all short exact sequences of A-A-bimodules that are split as A-K-bimodules also split as A-A-bimodules. The converse can be proven by a judicious use of the separability idempotent (similarly to the proof of Maschke's theorem, applying its components within and without the splitting maps).

Equivalently, the relative Hochschild cohomology groups  of (R,S) in any coefficient bimodule M is zero for n > 0. Examples of separable extensions are many including first separable algebras where R = separable algebra and S = 1 times the ground field. Any ring R with elements a and b satisfying ab = 1, but ba different from 1, is a separable extension over the subring S generated by 1 and bRa.

Relation to Frobenius algebras
A separable algebra is said to be strongly separable if there exists a separability idempotent that is symmetric, meaning

An algebra is strongly separable if and only if its trace form is nondegenerate, thus making the algebra into a particular kind of Frobenius algebra called a symmetric algebra (not to be confused with the symmetric algebra arising as the quotient of the tensor algebra).

If K is commutative, A is a finitely generated projective separable K-module, then A is a symmetric Frobenius algebra.

Relation to formally unramified and formally étale extensions

Any separable extension A / K of commutative rings is formally unramified. The converse holds if A is a finitely generated K-algebra. A separable flat (commutative) K-algebra A is formally étale.

Further results

A theorem in the area is that of J. Cuadra that a separable Hopf-Galois extension R | S has finitely generated natural S-module R.   A fundamental fact about a separable extension R | S is that it is left or right semisimple extension:  a short exact sequence of left or right R-modules that is split as S-modules, is split as R-modules.  In terms of G. Hochschild's relative homological algebra, one says that all R-modules are relative (R,S)-projective. Usually relative properties of subrings or ring extensions, such as the notion of separable extension, serve to promote theorems that say that the over-ring shares a property of the subring.  For example, a separable extension R of a semisimple algebra S has R semisimple, which follows from the preceding discussion.

There is the celebrated Jans theorem that a finite group algebra A over a field of
characteristic p is of finite representation type if and only if its Sylow p-subgroup is cyclic: the clearest proof is to note this fact for p-groups, then note that the group algebra is a separable extension of its Sylow p-subgroup algebra B as the index is coprime to the characteristic.  The separability condition above will imply every finitely generated A-module M is isomorphic to a direct summand
in its restricted, induced module.  But if B has finite representation type, the restricted module
is uniquely a direct sum of multiples of finitely many indecomposables, which induce to a finite number of constituent indecomposable modules of which M is a direct sum.  Hence A is of finite representation type if B is.  The converse is proven by a similar argument noting that every subgroup algebra B is a B-bimodule direct summand of a group algebra A.

References 

 
 Samuel Eilenberg and Tadasi Nakayama, On the dimension of modules and algebras. II. Frobenius algebras and quasi-Frobenius rings, Nagoya Math. J. Volume 9 (1955), 1–16.
 
 
 .
 
 
 

Algebras